Lubeidak (English: The Necklace) is a 1994 Oriya/Desiya drama film, written and directed by Ashok Mishra and produced by Sushanta Kumar Adhikari under the banner of Lopamudra Productions of Jeypore as the first of its kind covering the Bonda people.

Plot
The film is the story of Sania, the Bondo boy who won a national award in archery and inspired the producer and author of this project.

Lubeidak in the Bondo language means necklace. The Bondo tribe is considered one of the most primitive tribes of India, and, with its variety of sociocultural and anthropological appeal, has been depicted in this film. Mainstream civilized society has its own misnomers on the primitive tribe: the most prevalent one is that they are very wild and against the utsiders—anyone who doesn't belong to their race. But they call themselves remo, meaning human being. They have inbuilt capabilities which need to be channeled.

Cast

 Premalata Das		
 Hanu Dulari		
 Naba Panda		
 Rabi Panda		
 Satya Mishra
 Rajendra Hanu Dulari
 Sujata Achary
 Manju Santra
 Gupteswar Panigrahi
 Raja
 Kamakshi Nayak
 Ramesh Panigrahi
 Nabakishore Bhatra
 Prabhudan Bhatra
 Rajat Kumar Biswsi
 Siba Prasad Nag
 Damburu
 Gobardhan Panda
 Dilip Kumar Samantray
 Abdul Kader
 Gopalkrishna Samantray
 Rabiprasad Patra
 Aji

Recognition
This film won five awards in various categories at the 1994 Kerala State Film Awards. Padmalochan Das and Ashok Mishra won for best director; Sushanta Kumar Adhikari won the Mohan Das Goswami Award for best producer of a feature film; and Niranjan Das won for best cinematography. The other two film awards won were for best sound recording and best art direction.

References

External links
 

1990s Odia-language films
1994 films